Julio Adolfo Cozzi (14 July 1922 – 25 September 2011) was an Argentine football goalkeeper who won the Copa América 1947 with the Argentina national team.

Cozzi started his career in 1941 with Club Atlético Platense. He played for the club until 1949 when he joined Millonarios of Colombia where his team mates included Alfredo di Stéfano and Adolfo Pedernera.

Cozzi returned to Platense in 1955, he went on to play for Independiente between 1956 and 1959 and then Banfield of the Argentine 2nd division.

On 25 September 2011, he suffered a heart attack and died at the Clinic Fundación Favaloro in Buenos Aires.

Titles

External links
 La Pagina Calemar profile

References

1922 births
2011 deaths
Footballers from Buenos Aires
Argentine people of Italian descent
Argentine footballers
Argentina international footballers
Association football goalkeepers
Club Atlético Platense footballers
Millonarios F.C. players
Club Atlético Independiente footballers
Club Atlético Banfield footballers
Argentine Primera División players
Categoría Primera A players
Argentine expatriate footballers
Expatriate footballers in Colombia
Copa América-winning players